Kirk Johnson (born 1972) is a Canadian boxer.

Kirk Johnson may also refer to:

 Kirk Johnson (scientist) (born 1960), American scientist and museum administrator
 Kirk "Jelly Roll" Johnson, musician who appeared on the rock opera album !Hero
 Kirk W. Johnson, American author